This is a list of notable people from York County, New Brunswick and  Canada. Although not everyone in this list was born in York County, they all live or have lived in York County and have had significant connections to the communities.

This article does not include people from Fredericton, as they have their own section.

See also
List of people from New Brunswick

References

York